Forever for Now may refer to:

 Forever for Now (April Wine album), 1977
 Forever for Now (Harry Connick, Jr. album), 1993
 Forever for Now (LP album), 2014